The 2022 Colorado Secretary of State election took place on November 8, 2022, to elect the Secretary of State of Colorado. Incumbent Democrat Jena Griswold won re-election to a second term.

Democratic primary

Candidates

Nominee
Jena Griswold, incumbent secretary of state

Endorsements

Results

Republican primary
The Republican primary was held on June 28, 2022.

Candidates

Nominee
Pam Anderson, former Jefferson County clerk (2007–2015)

Eliminated in primary 
Mike O'Donnell, former head of Colorado Lending Source, a nonprofit economic development organization
Tina Peters, Mesa County clerk

Withdrew
David Winney, marine veteran (endorsed Tina Peters, running for El Paso County county commissioner)

Declined
Rose Pugliese, former Mesa County commissioner

Endorsements

Results

General election

Predictions

Endrosements

Polling

Results

Notes

Partisan clients

References

External links
Official campaign websites
Pam Anderson (R) for Secretary of State
Jena Griswold (D) for Secretary of State

Secretary of State
Colorado